Women's 400m races for class T46 amputee athletes at the 2004 Summer Paralympics were held in the Athens Olympic Stadium on 23 and 24 September. The event consisted of 2 heats and a final, and was won by Tshotlego Morama, representing .

1st round

Heat 1
23 Sept. 2004, 18:05

Heat 2
23 Sept. 2004, 18:12

Final round

24 Sept. 2004, 18:25

References

W
2004 in women's athletics